"Nea Ionia" (Greek: Νέα Ιωνία) is a song performed by Greek singer Stelios Kazantzidis.  The lyrics are by Pythagoras (Greek: Πυθαγόρας Παπασταματίου) and the music is by Christos Nikolopoulos.

The song was released in 1992 on the album Vradiazei. The song was written about 20 years before its release but was not recorded until 1992 because Kazantzidis took a leave from recording in 1975 due to issues with his recording label Minos EMI, which he accused of binding him with an abusive and unfair contract. The song is dedicated to Nea Ionia, a northern suburb of Athens where Kazantzidis was born and lived for many years of his live.

References

External links
Stelios Kazantzids sings Nea Ionia
Nea Ionia rehearsall with Stelios Kazantzidis (singer), Pythagoras (lyricist) and Christos Nikolopoulos (composer and bouzouki player)

Stelios Kazantzidis songs
Greek songs
1992 songs